Cheswardine is a civil parish in Shropshire, England.  It contains 21 listed buildings that are recorded in the National Heritage List for England.  Of these, one is listed at Grade II*, the middle of the three grades, and the others are at Grade II, the lowest grade.  The parish includes the village of Cheswardine, and smaller settlements including Ellerton, and is otherwise rural.  The Shropshire Union Canal passes through the parish, and associated with his are eleven listed buildings, namely eight bridges and three mileposts.  The other listed buildings are a church and associated structures, a watermill, a country house, and smaller houses and farmhouses. 


Key

Buildings

References

Citations

Sources

Lists of buildings and structures in Shropshire